S. K. Zibbu is an Indian first-class cricketer who represented Rajasthan. He made his first-class debut for Rajasthan in the 1951-52 Ranji Trophy on 8 December 1951.

References

External links
 

Indian cricketers
Rajasthan cricketers
Living people
Year of birth missing (living people)